Boy and Bicycle is the first film made by Ridley Scott. The black and white short was made on 16mm film while Scott was a photography student at the Royal College of Art in London in 1962.

Although a very early work - Scott would not direct his first feature for another 15 years - the film is significant in that it features a number of visual elements that would become motifs of Scott's work. Shot entirely in West Hartlepool and Seaton Carew the film features the cooling tower and blast furnaces of the local British Steel North Works foreshadowing images in Alien, Blade Runner and Black Rain. The central element of the Boy and Bicycle is re-used in Scott's advert for Hovis of the early 1970s. The film features Scott's younger brother, Tony Scott, as the boy. "We were both experiencing the process that would fundamentally take us through our live together, in terms of making movies", Ridley Scott commented about the film and his brother.

Scott secured finance from the British Film Institute to complete the editing and sound in 1965 including a track by John Barry called "Onward Christian Spacemen" (which originally appeared as the B-side of a cover version of the theme to The Human Jungle television series). Scott wanted to use the existing recording by Barry, but the composer was so impressed by the young filmmaker he agreed to produce a new recording for the film at limited cost.

This film has been released as an extra on the DVD for Scott's first feature The Duellists.

References

External links 
 

1965 films
British short films
Cycling films
Films directed by Ridley Scott
Films scored by John Barry (composer)
1960s English-language films